This article details the complete oeuvre of American guitarist Duane Denison. He is recognized for his work with the bands The Jesus Lizard and Tomahawk as well as his collaborations with drummer Jim Kimball in The Denison/Kimball Trio. He has also recorded with Firewater, Revolting Cocks and Pigface.

With Jim Kimball

Studio albums

Singles

The Jesus Lizard

Studio albums

Extended plays

Singles

Tomahawk

Studio albums
icjjfjkaocvwovi

Singles

Box sets

Music videos

As a band member

Studio albums

Credits

References

External links

Discographies of American artists
Rock music discographies